Alif Laila is a 1953 Bollywood film produced and directed by K. Amarnath.

Cast
Nimmi
Asha Mathur
Vijay Kumar
Pran
Murad
Amrit Rana
Maya Devi
Gope as Rasheed

Music
All lyrics were penned by Sahir Ludhianvi and music was composed by Shyam Sundar. Songs were sung by Mohammed Rafi, Talat Mahmood, Lata Mangeshkar, Asha Bhosle. 

"Bahaar Aayi Khili Kaliyan" - Lata Mangeshkar
"Dilon Ke Shikar Ko" - Asha Bhosle
"Dilon Ko Dard Bananewaale" - Lata Mangeshkar
"Khamosh Kyun Ho" - Lata Mangeshkar, Mohammed Rafi
"Khada Hoon Der Se" - Talat Mahmood
"Kya Raat Suhani Hai" - Lata Mangeshkar, Mohammed Rafi
"Mere Nagmon Mein Un  Mastana" - Talat Mahmood
"Raaten Pyaar Ki Beet Jaayengi" - Asha Bhosle

References

External links
 

Films scored by Shyam Sunder
1950s Hindi-language films
Films directed by K. Amarnath